Macrorhyncolus is a genus of true weevils in the family of beetles known as Curculionidae. There are about five described species in Macrorhyncolus.

Species
These five species belong to the genus Macrorhyncolus:
 Macrorhyncolus crassitarsis Wollaston, T.V., 1873 c
 Macrorhyncolus crassiusculus Wollaston, T.V., 1873 c
 Macrorhyncolus littoralis Broun (1880) g b (driftwood weevil)
 Macrorhyncolus protractus Horn, G.H., 1873 c
 Macrorhyncolus sulcirostris Voss, 1957 c
Data sources: i = ITIS, c = Catalogue of Life, g = GBIF, b = Bugguide.net

References

Further reading

External links

 

Cossoninae